Aimin District is a district of Mudanjiang, Heilongjiang, People's Republic of China.

Administrative divisions 
Aimin is divided into seven subdistricts and one town: 

Subdistricts:
Xiangyang Subdistrict, Huanghua Subdistrict, Tiebei Subdistrict, Xinhua Subdistrict, Daqing Subdistrict, Xingping Subdistrict, Beishan Subdistrict

The only town is Sandaoguan Town

Notes and references 

Aimin
Mudanjiang